Robert K. Heuberger (12 January 1922 – c. 29 January 2021) was a Swiss real estate entrepreneur, patron of the arts and an author under the pseudonym Victor Vermont.

Life and career 
Heuberger grew up with three siblings in poor circumstances and lost his father when he was three years old. He completed his training at the Swiss Volksbank in Aarburg in the 1930s. When the Second World War began, he was forced to run the bank branch alone as an apprentice. As a bank and insurance buyer, he later worked for the Volksbank as an accountant, credit manager and securities specialist, then as an agency manager for the Bâloise insurance company.

In 1947 he was promoted to management secretary in Winterthur, where he also met his wife Ruth née Mötteli (* 1924, † 2016), Together with his wife Heuberger founded Siska Heuberger Holding AG in 1954, with which he implemented a series of major  projects, especially in eastern Switzerland, with the construction of about 1000 apartments in Winterthur. According to the economic magazine's BILANZ, he had assets of approximately CHF300 to 500 million in 2012.

He was the father of the entrepreneurs Günter and Rainer Heuberger. Günter Heuberger was an media entrepreneur (Radio Top, Tele Top) and Rainer Heuberger was Zurich's former cantonal councilor (SVP) of Siska Verwaltungs AG.

Engagement 
Heuberger's public commitments include funding for the establishment of the Club of Rome in Winterthur, setting up the non-profit «Robert and Ruth Heuberger Foundation» in 1987, as well as founding an innovation prize for young entrepreneurs. In 2007, the City of Winterthur awarded him the prize of the "Winterthur Lion". In 2013, Heuberger opposed the popular initiative to abolish conscription by means of double-page advertisements.

Honors 
The asteroid 82232 Heuberger, discovered by Markus Griesser at the Swiss Eschenberg Observatory in 2001, has been named in honor of Robert and Ruth Heuberger's commitment to social and cultural institutions.  The official naming citation was published by the Minor Planet Center on 13 July 2004.

Artistic work 
Heuberger, who was a screenwriter published the following works under the pseudonym «Victor Vermont»:
 Alltagstrilogie, Television play
 Das Geld liegt auf der Strasse, Theatre play 
 Eine Frau bleibt eine Frau, Theatre play

Book 
 Robert Heuberger and Karl Lüönd: Nicht wie der Wind weht … Lebensbericht eines Unternehmers. NZZ Libro, Zürich 2013, .

References

External links 
 Renat Künzi: Für den Club of Rome führen alle Wege nach Winterthur, Swissinfo, 23 April 2008
 Sternwarte Eschenberg: Website der Winterthurer Sternwarte
 Siska Heuberger Holding AG: Geschäftssitz, Firmengründer und Jahresbericht, 21 March 2015
 Walter Pellinghausen: Robert Heuberger: "Der bewegte Mann". In: Bilanz. 5. November 2010 (bilanz.ch).
 Melanie Knüsel: Robert Heuberger: "Der schreibende Immobilien-Tycoon". In: Handelszeitung. 8. November 2011 (handelszeitung.ch).

1922 births
2021 deaths
20th-century Swiss businesspeople
21st-century Swiss businesspeople
Patrons of the arts
Swiss investors
Swiss screenwriters
Male screenwriters